General elections were held in Paraguay on 10 February 1963. Opposition parties had been legalized just a year earlier, after a 15-year period in which the Colorado Party was the only legally permitted party. They were the first elections in which opposition parties were allowed to take part since 1939.

Incumbent president Alfredo Stroessner of the Colorado Party was re-elected for a fourth term, whilst the Colorado Party won 40 of the 60 seats in the Chamber of Deputies. Voter turnout was 85.1%.

Results

References

Paraguay
1963 in Paraguay
Elections in Paraguay
Presidential elections in Paraguay
Alfredo Stroessner
February 1963 events in South America